The Frost Entomological Museum is an active research institution, associated with the Pennsylvania State University's flagship campus in University Park, PA. The museum houses a research collection, estimated at 1.3 million  arthropod specimens, and a public exhibition and educational space. Although the museum was founded in 1969, much of the collection dates to the early 1900s and even the late 1800s.

The research collection provides a record of the insect biodiversity of the Commonwealth of Pennsylvania and the eastern and southeastern United States. Major collection holdings include:
 Aphididae - The John O. Pepper aphid collection consists of over 32,000 mounted specimens, representing at least 800 species. The collection is especially strong in aphids from central Pennsylvania.
 Anoplura - The K. C. Kim collection of sucking lice comprises more than 15,000 slide-mounts and represents approximately 300 species.
 Odonata - The George H. and Alice F. Beatty Collection includes more than 60,000 dragonfly and damselfly specimens, collected from the 1940s through the 1970s. More than 1,000 species are represented, and half of the specimens were collected in Mexico.

Other notable collections, which reflect the interests of the museum’s namesake, Dr. Stuart W. Frost, include leaf miners, light-trapped insects, and arthropods of the Archbold Biological Station.

References

External References 
 Penn State University Department of Entomology
 The Frost Entomological Museum

Pennsylvania State University
Museums in Centre County, Pennsylvania
Natural history museums in Pennsylvania
University museums in Pennsylvania
Entomological organizations
1969 establishments in Pennsylvania